Tatiana Lobach (born January 8, 1974, Khmelnytskyi, Ukraine) is a Russian political figure and a deputy of the 8th State Duma.

At the beginning of the 2000s, Lobach was elected deputy of the Balaklava District in the Council of the city of Sevastopol of the 4th and 5th convocations. In 2010-2011, Lobach worked as deputy chairman of the Balaklava regional state administration for economic issues. In September 2019, Lobach was elected deputy of the Legislative Assembly of Sevastopol. Since September 2021, she has served as deputy of the 8th State Duma.

References

1974 births
Living people
United Russia politicians
21st-century Russian politicians
21st-century Russian women politicians
Eighth convocation members of the State Duma (Russian Federation)
Chernivtsi University alumni
Politicians from Khmelnytskyi, Ukraine